Indians in Poland consist of migrants from India to Poland and their locally born descendants. The estimations of number of Indians in Poland vary from 15,000 to 38,000 by governmental sources.

Migration history
Indians started migrating to Poland in the late 1980s and early 1990s when the political situation changed, and new opportunities started to emerge.  Most of them are businessmen  who migrated to cash in on the economic boom after Warsaw opted for a free-market economy in 1989 and joined the European Union in 2004. In 2007, Poland signed an agreement with India to admit more Indian migrant workers, as part of an effort to ameliorate labour shortages caused by the outward migration of hundreds of thousands of Polish workers to richer countries in the European Union. New important group of Indians in Poland are students and academics. Recent research shows that the Indian community is quite well integrated in the Polish society.

Number of work permits for Indian citizens and number of Indian students enrolled in Polish universities

  (Calculated on basis of col. 1 and col. 2)

Culture
The Indian community in Poland is a business minded community. They have their own 'Little India' in Warsaw and Krakow as a large number of the community are based there while there are others based in Łódź and Pabianice.

Religion

Hindus and Sikhs form the majority of the Indian community. Hinduism has spread to Poland through ISKCON missionaries since 1976. The first Polish Hindu temple was established in 1980 in Czarnów, Lower Silesian Voivodeship (New Shantipur Temple in Czarnów). A new Hindu Temple named the Hindu Bhavan was constructed in Warsaw. The Indian community hopes that the temple sensitizes the community's youth towards Indian tradition and customs as well as to use the new place of worship as a tool to integrate with Polish society.

There are about 120 Sikh families in Warsaw headed by J J Singh, the most prominent Indian, who is also the president of Indo Polish Chamber of Commerce and Industries. The city's Sikh Gurdwara the only Sikh shrine in the whole of Eastern Europe and it is the place where both Sikhs and Sindhis come together to celebrate Baisakhi. The Kerala Association of Poland conducts Onam, the festival of Keralites year on year, headed by Pradeep Nayar and Chandramohan Nallur. The Association of Bengalis in Poland headed by Pradipto Maulik together with Durga Puja Committee conduct 3-4 days long festival of Durga Puja. Durgotsav which is the largest Indian community festival in Poland. Gujaratis and Tamilians also have their associations and celebrate Holi, Dandya and Pongal respectively.

See also

 India–Poland relations
 Indians in Russia
 Hinduism in Poland
 Romani people in Poland

References

External links
Indian Community of Poland

Asian_diaspora_in_Poland
Ethnic groups in Poland
Poland
India–Poland relations
Poland